Arthur St George (1629 – August 1701) was an Irish politician.

He represented Athlone in the Irish House of Commons in the Parliaments of Ireland between 1692 and 1693 and then 1695 to 1699.

References
 https://web.archive.org/web/20090601105535/http://www.leighrayment.com/commons/irelandcommons.htm

1629 births
1701 deaths
Irish MPs 1692–1693
Irish MPs 1695–1699
Members of the Parliament of Ireland (pre-1801) for Athlone